CFJR-FM is a Canadian radio station broadcasting at 104.9 FM in Brockville, Ontario. The station owned by Bell Media, airs an adult contemporary format branded as Move 104.9.

History
The station was launched in 1926 as CFLC at 1010 kHz in Prescott. The station was operated by The Radio Association of Prescott (W.H. Plumb, A.G. Halliday, A.C. Casselman, P.J. McAndrews, L.F. Knight, H.M. Perkins, W.A. Cornell, J.E. White and D.S. Carlisle). The call letters stand for: "Canada's Finest Little Community". In the 1940s, Jack Whitby's Eastern Ontario Broadcasting Co. Ltd. purchased CFLC and moved the studios to the Fulford Building on Courthouse Avenue, near King Street in Brockville. In addition to being owner, Jack Whitby was also manager. In 1943, the callsign changed to CFBR ("BR" stood for BRockville). In 1946, it changed to CFJM ("JM" for Jack Murray) until it changed to its current callsign to CFJR ("JR" for Jack Radford) in 1950 where it has remained since. The station also had gone through different ownerships over the years.

The station changed frequencies to 930 in the early 1930s, until March 29, 1941, when it moved to 1450 kHz and moved one last time on the AM band to 830 kHz on September 19, 1985, before it moved to its current frequency on July 14, 2003.

In 1959, CFJR's news department hired a 21-year-old college dropout, Peter Jennings. This was Jennings debut in journalism. Many of his stories, including his coverage of a local train wreck, were picked up by the CBC and, in March 1961, he moved on to CJOH-TV, then a new television station in Ottawa.

Bruce Wylie, the morning show co-host, is the longest-tenured active talent in Bell Media Radio celebrating 50 years at CFJR on April 7, 2021. Today, it is also the only AC station owned by Bell Media that originated on the AM dial. It is also Bell Media's only AC station not broadcasting at 100,000 watts like its sister AC stations, CHQM-FM in Vancouver or CJMJ-FM in Ottawa.

On December 27, 2020, as part of a mass format reorganization by Bell Media, CFJR rebranded as Move 104.9. While the station would run jockless for the first week of the format, on-air staff would return on January 4, 2021.

References

External links
Move 104.9
 

FJR
FJR
FJR
Mass media in Brockville
Radio stations established in 1926
1926 establishments in Ontario